Two National Football League offensive backfields were at one point known as the Million Dollar Backfield:

 Million Dollar Backfield (Chicago Cardinals), backfield of the Chicago Cardinals  1947
 Million Dollar Backfield (San Francisco 49ers), backfield of the San Francisco 49ers  1954